Solveig Sundbø Abrahamsen (born 13 September 1963) is a Norwegian politician for the Conservative Party. She was elected as deputy to the Parliament of Norway from Telemark in 2013. She meets as deputy for Torbjørn Røe Isaksen, and is member of the Standing Committee on Finance and Economic Affairs.

References 

Conservative Party (Norway) politicians
Members of the Storting
Politicians from Telemark
1963 births
Living people
21st-century Norwegian politicians